Naso may be,
Nasö language, China
Teribe language, Panama